The Bluegrass Sessions is the name of several albums:

The Bluegrass Sessions (Lynn Anderson album)
The Bluegrass Sessions (Janie Fricke album)
The Bluegrass Sessions (Merle Haggard album)
The Bluegrass Sessions: Tales from the Acoustic Planet, Vol. 2